The 2013 Giro della Toscana Int. Femminile – Memorial Michela Fanini will be the 19th edition of the Giro della Toscana Int. Femminile – Memorial Michela Fanini, a women's cycling stage race in Italy. It was rated by the UCI as a category 2.HC race and will be held between 11 and 15 September 2013.

Participating teams

UCI Women's Teams

MCipollini–Giordana
S.C. Michela Fanini-Rox

Vaiano Fondriest
Top Girls Fassa Bortolo
Be Pink
Team Argos–Shimano
Boels–Dolmans Cycling Team
Optum p/b Kelly Benefit Strategies
Team TIBCO
Hitec Products UCK
Orica–AIS
Chirio–Forno d'Asolo
Sengers Ladies Cycling Team
Pasta Zara–Cogeas

Faren–Let's Go Finland
Servetto Footon

National Teams
Germany
US National Team
Slovenia
France
Italy

Safety concerns
During the 4th and final stage 63 riders abandoned the race or did not take the start, in protest of the lack of security measures during the stage race.

Stages

Prologue
11 September 2013 – Campi Bisenzio to Campi Bisenzio,

Stage 1
12 September 2013 – Bottegone to Massa e Cozzile,

Stage 2
13 September 2013 – Porcari to Pontederao,

Stage 3
14 September 2013 – Segromigno to Capannori,

Stage 4
15 September 2013 – Lucca to Firenze,

Classification leadership

References

Giro della Toscana Int. Femminile – Memorial Michela Fanini
2013 in women's road cycling
2013 in Italian sport